Coluzea berthae is a species of large sea snail, marine gastropod mollusc in the family Columbariidae.

Description

Distribution
This marine species occurs off Madagascar.

References

 Monsecour D. & Kreipl K. (2003) A new Columbarium (Turbinellidae) (Columbarium berthae) from Madagascar. Gloria Maris 41(6): 141-146

External links

Columbariidae
Gastropods described in 2003